Grace Lee is an American director and producer.  She is known for both her documentaries and narrative films, which often mix in elements of documentaries.

Biography 
Lee is of Korean heritage and from Columbia, Missouri.  She originally wanted to be a journalist, but after interviewing sex workers in South Korea, she realized that she could tell better stories through film.  Back in the United States, she enrolled in UCLA.  She now lives in Los Angeles, California.

Career 
Her first short, Girl Meets Boy was, according to Lee, a two-minute "response to those who have questioned my ability to speak loudly and in English".  In 2000, she won a UCLA Spotlight Award for her short film The Ride Home.  Barrier Device, her master's thesis, stars Sandra Oh and won a silver medal at the 29th Student Academy Awards.  In 2002, she was profiled in Filmmaker as one of the New Faces of Independent Film.  Her 2004 short film Best of the Wurst was nominated for the Berlin International Film Festival's Berlin Today Award and is featured in the Deutsches Currywurst Museum.  Following this, she filmed The Grace Lee Project, a 2005 documentary about Asian-American women who share her name.  With In-Ah Lee, she formed LeeLee Films in 2006.

American Zombie, her feature narrative film directorial debut, was released in 2007.  A mockumentary about zombie civil rights in Los Angeles, it satirized her earlier experience with documentary films.  Janeane from Des Moines, released in 2012, is about a conservative housewife who attends the 2012 Republican Party primary in Iowa.  The film mixes staged scenes and real interviews with Republican politicians, conducted in character without the knowledge of the media or politicians.  ABC World News Tonight picked up the story, not realizing that Janeane is a fictional character.  American Revolutionary: The Evolution of Grace Lee Boggs is a 2013 documentary about Grace Lee Boggs, an activist that Lee met while filming The Grace Lee Project.  Her next documentary, Makers: Women in Politics, aired on PBS in September 2014 as part of a series based on Makers: Women Who Make America.  In December 2015, Off the Menu: Asian America, a documentary about Asian food, aired on PBS.

In November 2015, she received funding from the Sundance Institute as a part of the Women at Sundance Fellows program.

Filmography

References

External links 
 
 

Living people
American documentary film directors
American film directors of Korean descent
English-language film directors
Film directors from Missouri
Artists from Columbia, Missouri
UCLA Film School alumni
Businesspeople from Columbia, Missouri
American women documentary filmmakers
Year of birth missing (living people)
21st-century American women